Batu Buruk is a state constituency in Terengganu, Malaysia, that has been represented in the Terengganu State Legislative Assembly since 1959.

The state constituency was created in the 1958 redistribution and is mandated to return a single member to the Terengganu State Legislative Assembly under the first past the post voting system.

History
2004–2016: The constituency contains the polling districts of Pantai Batu Buruk, Kampung Nibung, Gong Tok Nasek, Bukit Depu, Kuala Ibai, Cendering Pantai, Cendering, Taman Permint Jaya, Mengabang Tengah, Kampung Kolam, Kenanga.

2016–present: The constituency contains the polling districts of Pantai Batu Buruk, Nibung, Gong Tok Nasek, Bukit Depu, Kuala Ibai, Chendering Pantai, Chendering, Taman Permint Jaya, Mengabang Tengah, Kolam, Kenanga, Tok Adis.

Representation history

Election results

References

Terengganu state constituencies